Danilo Montecino Neco (born 27 January 1986) is a Brazilian former football player.

Career
In January 2014, Neco signed a one-year contract with Aktobe of the Kazakhstan Premier League, following the cancellation of his Alania Vladikavkaz contract after they dissolved. Following the conclusion of the 2015 season, Neco was transfer listed by Aktobe. In January 2017, Neco joined South Korean club Seongnam FC of the K League Challenge.

Career statistics

Honours

Aktobe
Kazakhstan Super Cup (1): 2014

References

External links 
 

1986 births
Footballers from São Paulo (state)
Living people
Brazilian footballers
Association football forwards
Associação Atlética Ponte Preta players
Jeju United FC players
FC Spartak Vladikavkaz players
FC Aktobe players
Seongnam FC players
Campeonato Brasileiro Série B players
K League 1 players
Russian First League players
Russian Premier League players
Kazakhstan Premier League players
K League 2 players
Brazilian expatriate footballers
Expatriate footballers in South Korea
Brazilian expatriate sportspeople in South Korea
Expatriate footballers in Russia
Brazilian expatriate sportspeople in Russia
Expatriate footballers in Kazakhstan
Brazilian expatriate sportspeople in Kazakhstan
People from Mirandópolis